Jatindramohan Bagchi (27 November 1878 — 1 February 1948) was a Bengali poet and editor.

Early life

He was born at Jamsherpur village, in Nadia district in rural Bengal. He took his first degree from the Duff College (now Scottish Church College) in Calcutta.

Professional career
He worked in varying capacities as secretary to Justice Saradacharan Mitra, and to the Maharaja of Natore. Later he would work as License Collector of the Kolkata Municipal Corporation, and as manager of FN Gupta Company.

Literary career
He was a prolific contributor to a number of literary journals. Between 1909 and 1913, he also edited the cultural journal Manasi. In 1921 and in 1922, he served as a joint editor of another cultural journal Jamuna. He would later become the owner and editor of the journal Purvachal between 1947 and 1948. . He is considered a major voice of the post-Rabindranath period in Bengali poetry. His poetry conveyed the intricacies of life in rural Bengal, in all its joys and sorrows. He died on 1 February 1948.

Works

Poems
Kajladidi 
Andha Badhu.
Satyadas

Collected poems
Lekha (1906), 
Rekha (1910), 
Aparajita (1915), 
Bandhur Dan (1918), 
Jagarani (1922), 
Niharika (1927) 
Mahabharati (1936)

Criticism
Rabindranath O Yugasahitya

References

Indian male poets
Bengali male poets
1878 births
1948 deaths
People from Nadia district
Scottish Church College alumni
Poets from West Bengal
20th-century Indian poets
19th-century Indian poets
19th-century Indian male writers
20th-century Indian male writers
Writers from Kolkata
Poets in British India